Guangde Rocket Launch Site also known as Base 603 (603基地) is a suborbital launch site that was operated by the Chinese Academy of Sciences located in Shijiedu, Shijie Town, Guangde County, Xuancheng Prefecture, Anhui province on the Chinese east coast.

The location of the site was surrounded by mountains in four directions, with no roads and no access to resources, but chosen as an upgrade to the too limited facilities of Nanhui Launch Site.

History
The construction of the launch site was started in March 1960 under the direction of Department 581 (including the Second Geophysics Institute), and completed in less than six months, including a weather station, radars, control and tracking stations, launch pad, service tower, propellant storage room, propulsion testing facilities, living quarters, etc.

The launch center was first directed by the Institute of Geology and Geophysics Chinese Academy of Sciences, then in June 1960 by the Shanghai Institute of Mechanical and Electrical Engineering. Finally the Fifth Academy of the Ministry of National Defence took its control in 1963.

China launched its first ever successful T-7 sounding rocket in September 1960.

From 1960 to 1966, several of the T-7 and T-7A sounding rockets were launched at the site.

The first successful flight of a biological experimental T-7A/S1 sounding rocket transporting eight white mice was launched and recovered on July 19, 1964.

The last launch was reportedly that of a dog aboard a T-7A/S2 on 28 July 1966.

See also

 Chinese space program

References

External links 
 Shijiedu, Encyclopedia Astronautica

Rocket launch sites
Xuancheng
Chinese space program facilities
Spaceports in China